José Manuel Zozaya y Bermúdez (4 July 1778 – 21 June 1853) was the first Mexican diplomat to ever represent his country in the United States, serving as Envoy Extraordinary and Minister Plenipotentiary from 12 December 1822 to 20 May 1823.

Aside from his diplomatic activities, Zozaya served as attorney-in-fact of Agustín de Iturbide, as congressman for Guanajuato (1820), as auditor for the Army, and operated the first paper mill in the history of Mexico.

Works
 (1839).
 (1841).

Notes and references

1778 births
1853 deaths
People from Salvatierra, Guanajuato
Politicians from Guanajuato
Ambassadors of Mexico to the United States
Members of the Chamber of Deputies (Mexico)
Presidents of the Chamber of Deputies (Mexico)